Stag  is the debut solo album by Amy Ray of Indigo Girls, released in 2001 on her Daemon Records label. Ray is accompanied by the Butchies, the Rockateens, Joan Jett, Josephine Wiggs and Kate Schellenbach on the album. She attributes the Butchies with contributing a punk rock influence to some of the songs.

Track listing
All songs written by Amy Ray, except where noted.
"Johnny Rottentail" – 2:00
"Laramie" – 5:10
"Lucystoners" – 3:56
"Hey Castrator" – 4:05
"Late Bloom" – 2:24
"Measure of Me" (Amy Ray and Kaia Wilson) – 5:55
"Black Heart Today" – 2:10
"Mtns of Glory" – 2:11
"Lazyboy" – 3:05
"On Your Honor" – 4:01

Personnel
Amy Ray – guitar and vocals
Gerry Hansen – drums
Kelly Hogan – guitar and vocals
Larry Holt – guitar
Danielle Howle – vocals
Joan Jett – guitar and vocals
Will Lochamy – drums
Chris Lopez – guitar, drums, and vocals
Hunter Manasco – guitar and vocals
Alison Martlew – bass guitar
Katharine McElroy – bass guitar and vocals
Kate Schellenbach – drums and glockenspiel
Josephine Wiggs – bass guitar and keyboards
Kaia Wilson – guitar and vocals
Melissa York – drums, percussion and vocals

References

2001 debut albums
Amy Ray albums
Collaborative albums
Daemon Records albums
Folk punk albums
Self-released albums